Mario Gerla (1943–2019) was an Italian computer scientist and engineer, Distinguished Professor, Jonathan B. Postel Chair and Chair of the Department (2015 – 2018) of Computer Science of University of California, Los Angeles (UCLA). He co-authored 11 books. He died in 2019.

Academic career 
He attended and graduated with an engineering degree (1966) from Polytechnic University of Milan and received his Master's (1970) and Ph.D. (1973) degrees in Computer Science from UCLA, studying under faculty advisor Leonard Kleinrock. He joined the UCLA faculty in 1976. At UCLA, he was the director of Center for Autonomous Intelligent Networks and also Network Research Lab. 

Gerla was elected as an ACM Fellow in 2018 for "contributions to design and analysis of mobile wireless protocols for vehicular safety and traffic applications".

References

1943 births
Italian electrical engineers
Italian computer scientists
UCLA Henry Samueli School of Engineering and Applied Science faculty
University of California, Los Angeles alumni
Polytechnic University of Milan alumni
2019 deaths
Fellows of the Association for Computing Machinery